The Sheffield United Harriers athletics club were formed in 1894 in Sheffield, England.

The first meeting of the club was reported in the Sporting Chronicle 22 May 1894.

"The first evening meeting of this newly formed club took place yesterday evening at Bramall Lane in fine weather before 1,000 spectators."

There were only 3 events on the timetable; the 100 yards, the 2 mile running race and the 1 mile bicycle race.

In 1975, 'Sheffield United Harriers' amalgamated with 'Sheffield City Athletic Club' to form 'Sheffield Athletic Club'.

Kit 
The club's vest consists of a red and white hoops.

Sports teams and clubs in Sheffield
Athletics clubs in England
1894 establishments in England